Panorpa nuptialis is a species of common scorpionfly in the family Panorpidae. It is also found in North America. It is known to be quite common in Texas, in wooded areas, and densely vegetated ravines. Despite its name it does not use its tail to sting but rather to mate with females of its species. 

Description
Panorpa nuptialis is known to grow up to an inch long, and can be identified by its orange wings with defined angulate black bands.

References

External links

 

Panorpidae
Articles created by Qbugbot
Insects described in 1863